Bavuttiyude Namathil (English: In the name of Bavutty) is a 2012 Malayalam drama thriller film produced and written by Ranjith, directed by G. S. Vijayan, and starring Mammootty in the title role, along with Kavya Madhavan, Shankar Ramakrishnan, Kaniha, Rima Kallingal and Vineeth. The film was earlier titled Malabar.

G. S. Vijayan returned to directing after a hiatus of 12 years to create Bavuttiyude Namathil. The film was released on 21 December 2012.

Plot
Mammootty plays Bavutty, a chauffeur in a wealthy household. He is much more than a driver; he is very much part of the family. For Sethu (played by Shankar Ramakrishnan), his employer, life is all about making money, but Bavutty is a simple man with small dreams. Kavya Madhavan plays Vanaja, Sethu's wife, while Kaniha appears as Mariam, a housemaid. Bavutty is also acting in a small scale movie called Malabar which Vanaja is producing. Rima Kallingal plays the role of Noorjahan, a tuition teacher.

The story takes on a twist when Vanaja's ex-lover Satheeshan (Vineeth) shows up. At first Vanaja thinks that he has come out of his poverty to seek help and tries to help him. But later, it is revealed that he has come to blackmail her and to squeeze out huge money. Satheeshan tells Vanaja that if they don't pay him 10 lakh rupees, he will tell her husband that Vanaja was already once married before her marriage with Sethu. Bavutty tries to sell his land and give off the ransom, but Bavutty's ally Alavi (Harisree Ashokan) beats up Satheeshan with the help of goons. Satheeshan talks about this to Bavutty which Sethu overhears. Sethu at first decides to break up with Vanaja but Bavutty cools him down and the marriage is saved. In the end, Bavutty is seen still giving 10 lakh to Satheeshan after selling his land and advising him to earn his bread and butter from now on and never to beg again.

Cast
 Mammootty as Bavutti
 Kavya Madhavan as Vanaja
 Shankar Ramakrishnan as Sethu
 Kaniha as Mariam
 Kottayam Nazeer as Sreenivasan/Sreeni, Vanaja's elder brother
 Rima Kallingal as Noorjahan
 Vineeth as Satheeshan
 Sudheesh as Sreekandan
 Harisree Ashokan as Alavi
 Mohan Jose as S.I Josemon
 Anikha as Sethu's daughter
 Augustine as Kunjappa Haji
 Sudheer Karamana as Constable Pavithran
 Lena as Sethu's friend
 Baby Raniya as Lakshmi/Lachu
 Jaseem Tirur

Production
Bavuttiyude Namathil was directed by G. S. Vijayan. Vijayan had been on a sabbatical for 12 years. Vijayan said, "I have been waiting for a script to make a film that is clean and that can entertain the entire family. I was delighted when Ranjith came up with the script of Bavuttiyude Namathil and decided to produce it himself."

The film started shooting on 8 September 2012 in Kozhikode. It was produced by Ranjith under the banner Capitol Theaters. Kavya Madhavan won the Best Actress award at Asianet Film Awards.

Reception
The film was released on 21 December 2012. Paresh C. Palicha of Rediff gave the film a rating of 2.5/5, saying, "Bavuttiyude Namathil is watchable at least for the performance of the three main characters." Metro Matinee gave it a positive review, calling it "a charming film that's plainly life-affirming without being overly pretentious or markedly melodramatic". India Glitz gave the film a rating of 7/10 and said that "This Bavootty is clichéd, but engrossing". Shankar Ramakrishnan won the Asianet Film Award for Best Supporting Actor for this film.

References

2012 films
2010s Malayalam-language films
2012 thriller drama films
Indian thriller drama films
Films directed by G. S. Vijayan
Films scored by Shahabaz Aman
2012 drama films